Lila May Banks Cockrell (January 19, 1922 – August 29, 2019) was an American politician who served twice as mayor of San Antonio, Texas. During World War II, she served in the WAVES branch of the United States Navy. She served as President of the Dallas and San Antonio chapters of the  League of Women Voters during the 1950s.

Political career
After serving for a decade on the city council, including her 1969 service as the city's first woman mayor Pro Tem, Cockrell was elected in 1975 to the first of four two-year terms as Mayor of San Antonio. At the time of her inauguration, San Antonio's population gave her the status of the mayor over the largest American city being governed by a woman. She is often listed as the first woman  in the United States to be elected mayor of a major metropolis. However, Bertha Knight Landes was mayor of Seattle 1926–1928. Cockrell's first three terms ran consecutively 1975–1981. At the end of her third term, she chose not to run because of the illness of her husband Sidney Earl Cockrell Jr. She was succeeded by Henry Cisneros.
Widowed in 1986, she was elected to her fourth term as mayor in 1989 when Cisneros left office. Lila Cockrell was a registered Republican.

Retirement
After retiring from political office, Cockrell served on many municipal commissions and civic boards. In 2013, she retired as president of the San Antonio Parks Foundation, a position she had held since 1998.

On May 29, 2019 Cockrell was forbidden to vote in the 2019 San Antonio mayoral election because she lacked the required identification under Texas ID laws. Many people in the San Antonio community as well as politicians such as Pete Buttigieg were outraged that Cockrell was forbidden to cast her ballot. The incident started up a controversy about Texas voter ID laws. On May 31, 2019, Cockrell cast her vote in the election.

Death
Cockrell's Health declined in the time leading up to her death. Cockrell died at the age of 97 under hospice care on August 29, 2019 in her apartment in San Antonio, Texas. On September 3, 2019, a public visitation was held at Mission Park Funeral Chapel North. On September 5, 2019, a private memorial service and a public tribute were held at the Lila Cockrell Theatre. Her final burial place is Mission Burial Park North in San Antonio.

Honors

The Lila Cockrell Theatre, named in her honor, is part of the Henry B. González Convention Center in Downtown San Antonio. Also, a meeting room at the Convention Center directly below the Theatre is named the Mayor Cockrell Room in her honor.
She was inducted into the Texas Women's Hall of Fame in 1984.
She received an honorary doctorate from St. Mary's University in May 2017 during the commencement ceremony for the class of 2017.

See also
 Timeline of San Antonio, 1950s–1990s

References

External links
Delta Delta Delta Biography
City of San Antonio's Lila Cockrell Theatre Website
Interviews with Lila Cockrell, July 25, 1984, July 15, 1994, April 9, 1997, University of Texas at San Antonio: Institute of Texan Cultures: Oral History Collections, UA 15.01, University of Texas at San Antonio Libraries Special Collections.

 

1922 births
2019 deaths
Politicians from Fort Worth, Texas
Female United States Navy officers
Military personnel from Texas
Mayors of San Antonio
San Antonio City Council members
WAVES personnel
Burials in Texas
Women mayors of places in Texas
Women city councillors in Texas
20th-century American politicians
20th-century American women politicians
21st-century American women